Lake County is situated in the northeastern corner of the U.S. state of Illinois, along the shores of Lake Michigan. As of the 2020 census, it has a population of 714,342, making it the third-most populous county in Illinois. Its county seat is Waukegan, the tenth-largest city in Illinois. The county is primarily suburban, with some urban areas and some rural areas. Due to its location, immediately north of Cook County, Lake County is one of the collar counties of the Chicago metropolitan area. Its northern boundary is the Wisconsin state line.

According to the 2010 census, Lake County is the second wealthiest county in the state by per capita income, after DuPage County. Additionally, Lake County ranks as the 27th wealthiest county in the nation.  The county includes the affluent North Shore communities of Lake Forest, Lake Bluff, and Highland Park, and much of the county's wealth is concentrated in this area, as well as in communities bordering Cook County to the south and McHenry County to the west. The north and northwest areas of the county, though historically rural and exurban, have experienced rapid suburbanization in the past three decades, while the lakefront communities of Waukegan, North Chicago, and Zion are post-industrial areas and majority non-white.

Naval Station Great Lakes is located in the city of North Chicago. It is the United States Navy's Headquarters Command for training, and the Navy's only recruit training center.

History

The county, which was primarily unsettled prairie and was still home to its native Potawatomi Indians, was created by the Illinois State Legislature in 1839.  At that time, Libertyville, then known as Independence Grove, was the first county seat. In 1841, however, the county's residents voted to move the county government to Little Fort, now Waukegan, where the commissioners had purchased a section of land from the state. Lake County's first courthouse was built on part of that land in 1844 and the remainder was sold to pay for the $4,000 construction cost.

The county's first courthouse was used solely for court sessions and the jail, but in 1853, commissioners constructed a building to accommodate county administration offices and house records. When fire damaged the courthouse on October 19, 1875, the county records were saved because they were in the adjacent building.

After the fire, proposals were made to move the county seat to Highland Park, Libertyville or another site in central Lake County. The county commissioners, however, decided to rebuild in Waukegan. The east half of the building was reconstructed at a cost of $45,000. In 1895, the first jail building was added to the government complex and a west addition was added to the courthouse in 1922. By 1938, county commissioners saw a need for additional space and approved the addition of a 5th Floor. This courthouse, however, was demolished in 1967 to make room for a new high-rise administration building, which was completed with the addition of the jail in 1969 and courts in 1970.

Shortly thereafter, the Lake County Board commissioned the construction of a multi-faceted justice facility and ground was broken in 1986 for the Robert H. Babcox Justice Center, named in memory of Sheriff Babcox, who served as Lake County Sheriff from 1982 to 1988. The justice center, which houses the county jail, work release program, sheriff's administration offices and three courtrooms, was finished in 1989 at a cost of $29.6 million.

Additional county government facilities have been built or expanded throughout Lake County, including the Coroner's Office, Health Department/Community Health Center facilities, Division of Transportation, Public Works and Winchester House. Lake County government services extend throughout the county's .

The historic Half Day Inn, a tavern/restaurant, was constructed in 1843.  This structure, once located at the corner of Milwaukee Avenue and Rte. 45/Old Half Day Road, was one of the oldest structures in Lake County until it was demolished in 2007 to make way for retail space, condominiums, and a retention pond.

Geography

It is the second-largest county in Illinois by total area and the only one that has more water area than land area. Most of the water is in Lake Michigan.

State parks
 Illinois Beach State Park
 North Point Marina
 Volo Bog State Natural Area
 Chain O'Lakes State Park

Lakes
Besides Lake Michigan, lakes in the county include:

 Bangs Lake
 Bluff Lake
 Butler Lake
 Channel Lake
 Lake Charles
 Countryside Lake
 Diamond Lake
 Druce Lake
 Dunns Lake
 East Loon Lake
 Fox Lake
 Gages Lake
 Grays Lake
 Highland Lake
 Island Lake
 Lake Linden
 Loch Lomond
 Loon Lake
 Lake Naomi
 Sterling Lake
 Valley Lake
 Wooster Lake
 Lake Zurich

Natural areas
Lake County's forest preserves and natural areas are administered by the Lake County Forest Preserves district. These facilities include traditional nature preserves, such as the Ryerson Conservation Area, as well as golf courses and historic homes, such as the Adlai Stevenson historic home. A long north–south string of the preserves in Lake County, including Half Day Woods, Old School Forest Preserve, Independence Grove, and Van Patten Woods, form the Des Plaines River Greenway, which contains the Des Plaines River Trail, a popular place for walking, running, and biking. Lake County is also home to Illinois Beach State Park, featuring over six miles of Lake Michigan shoreline, as well as dune areas, wetlands, prairie, and black oak savanna. Several local environmental groups operate in Lake County, such as Conserve Lake County and Citizens for Conservation, working to improve habitat. Volunteer opportunities also exist with the Lake County Forest Preserve District.

Adjacent counties
 Kenosha County, Wisconsin - north
 Cook County - south
 McHenry County - west

Major highways

County Routes and County Highways
Lake County's County Road system currently covers 300 miles of road. The county also employs two different numbering systems, a County Route system and a County Highway system. While both systems' can be seen on official road maps only the County Route designations have been indicated with highway markers on traffic signals or dedicated poles.

The County Route system in use today by Lake County was purportedly intended to be the dominant system for all of Illinois' counties and was proposed by the National Association of Counties (NACo), however their system was not chosen and instead each county was given the freedom to number their own county routes as well as choose whether or not to produce and display highway markers. Currently, only Lake County, Boone County, McHenry County, and Cook County use NACo's proposed numbering system, and of the four only Lake and McHenry Counties chose to fully display the County Route designations on highway markers. Cook County began to roll out the production of highway markers near the beginning of 2009 however the seemingly arbitrary numbering system as well as the cost to produce the markers resulted in a lot of confusion and backlash, and ultimately only some of the markers were produced and mounted.

For Lake County, all North—South-bound County Routes begin with an "A", while East—West-bound County Routes on the western half of the county begin with a "V", and those located eastern half begin with a "W".

Demographics

2020 census

Note: the US Census treats Hispanic/Latino as an ethnic category. This table excludes Latinos from the racial categories and assigns them to a separate category. Hispanics/Latinos can be of any race.

2010 Census

As of the 2010 Census, there were 703,462 people, 241,712 households, and 179,428 families residing in the county. The racial makeup of the county was 75.1% white, 7.0% black or African American, 6.3% Asian, 0.5% American Indian, 8.5% from other races, and 2.6% from two or more races. Those of Hispanic or Latino origin made up 19.9% of the population. In terms of ancestry, 20.5% were German, 12.9% were Irish, 9.4% were Polish, 6.9% were Italian, 6.5% were English, and 4.0% were American.

Of the 241,712 households, 40.8% had children under the age of 18 living with them, 59.6% were married couples living together, 10.4% had a female householder with no husband present, 25.8% were non-families, and 21.5% of all households were made up of individuals. The average household size was 2.82 and the average family size was 3.31. The median age was 36.7 years.
The median income for a household in the county was $78,948 and the median income for a family was $91,693. Males had a median income of $62,042 versus $44,200 for females. The per capita income for the county was $38,120. About 4.8% of families and 7.0% of the population were below the poverty line, including 9.6% of those under age 18 and 5.6% of those age 65 or over.

2019 United States Census Bureau American Community Survey estimates

According to 2019 US Census Bureau American Community Survey one-year estimates (which is conducted annually for cities over 65,000 via sampling), the population of Lake County, Illinois was 74.2% White (60.3% Non-Hispanic White and 13.9% Hispanic White), 6.8% Black or African American, 8.0% Asian, 0.3% Native American and Alaskan Native, 0.1% Pacific Islander, 7.4% Some Other Race, and 3.3% from two or more races. The White population continues to remain the largest racial category as Hispanics in Lake County primarily identify as White (62.1%) with others identifying as Some Other Race (31.7%), Multiracial (3.7%), Black (1.1%), American Indian and Alaskan Native (1.2%), Asian (0.2%), and Hawaiian and Pacific Islander (0.1%). By ethnicity, 22.4% of the total population is Hispanic-Latino (of any race) and 77.6% is Non-Hispanic (of any race). If treated as a separate category, Hispanics are the largest minority group in Lake County, Illinois. Majority of Hispanic/ Latino residents in Lake County, Illinois are of Mexican descent. Puerto Ricans, Cubans, Central Americans, and South Americans also reside in Lake County, Illinois.

Sports
The following sports teams play in Lake County:
 Lake County Fielders baseball (defunct)
 Lake County Coyotes baseball

Sites of interest

Amusement parks

 Six Flags Great America in Gurnee, Illinois
 Six Flags Hurricane Harbor Chicago in Gurnee, Illinois
 Lambs Farm in Libertyville, Illinois

Museums
 Volo Auto Museum in Volo, Illinois
 Lake County Discovery Museum in Libertyville, Illinois
 Warbird Heritage Foundation in Waukegan, Illinois
 Waukegan History Museum in Waukegan, Illinois
 Raupp Museum in Buffalo Grove, IL
 Shiloh House in Zion, IL
 Fort Hill Memorial Museum in Mundelein, IL
 Dunn Museum in Libertyville, IL

Performing arts

 Adler Arts Center in Libertyville, Illinois
 ArtWauk in Waukegan, Illinois
 Clockwise Theatre in Waukegan, Illinois
 Genesee Theatre in Waukegan, Illinois
 James Lumber Center for Performing Arts in Grayslake, Illinois
 Marriott Theatre in Lincolnshire, Illinois
 Ravinia Festival in Highland Park, Illinois

Other
 Naval Station Great Lakes
 Gurnee Mills shopping mall
 Lake Michigan

Communities

Cities

 Highland Park
 Highwood
 Lake Forest
 McHenry (unincorporated part)
 North Chicago
 Park City
 Waukegan
 Zion

Villages

 Antioch
 Bannockburn
 Barrington (part)
 Barrington Hills (part)
 Beach Park
 Buffalo Grove (part)
 Deerfield
 Deer Park (part)
 Fox Lake (part)
 Fox River Grove (part)
 Grayslake
 Green Oaks
 Gurnee
 Hainesville
 Hawthorn Woods
 Indian Creek
 Island Lake (part)
 Kildeer
 Lake Barrington
 Lake Bluff
 Lake Villa
 Lake Zurich
 Lakemoor (mostly)
 Libertyville
 Lincolnshire
 Lindenhurst
 Long Grove
 Mettawa
 Mundelein
 North Barrington
 Old Mill Creek
 Palatine (unincorporated part)
 Port Barrington (part)
 Riverwoods
 Round Lake
 Round Lake Beach
 Round Lake Heights
 Round Lake Park
 Spring Grove (unincorporated part)
 Third Lake
 Tower Lakes
 Vernon Hills
 Volo
 Wadsworth
 Wauconda
 Wheeling (part)
 Winthrop Harbor

Census-designated places

 Channel Lake
 Forest Lake
 Fox Lake Hills
 Gages Lake
 Grandwood Park
 Knollwood
 Lake Catherine
 Long Lake
 Venetian Village

Unincorporated communities

 Aptakisic
 Diamond Lake
 Eddy
 Fort Sheridan
 Fremont Center
 Gilmer
 Grange Hall
 Grass Lake
 Half Day
 Ingleside
 Ivanhoe
 Kennedy
 Loon Lake
 Millburn
 Monaville
 Palm Beach
 Prairie View
 Rondout (Part of Lake Bluff)
 Rosecrans
 Russell
 Sylvan Lake
 West Miltmore
 Wildwood
 Wilson

Townships
The county is divided into eighteen townships.

 Antioch
 Avon
 Benton
 Cuba
 Ela
 Fremont
 Grant
 Lake Villa
 Libertyville
 Moraine
 Newport
 Shields
 Vernon
 Warren
 Wauconda
 Waukegan
 West Deerfield
 Zion

Government

Politics
As a historic Yankee settlement, Lake County was initially a stronghold of the Free Soil Party. In the 1848 presidential election, it was Free Soil nominee and former President Martin van Buren’s strongest county, giving him over 58 percent of the vote.

Consequently, Lake County would turn rock-solid Republican for most of the next century and a half. After narrowly supporting Democrat Franklin Pierce in 1852, it voted Republican at all but one presidential election from 1856 to 1960. This tradition was only broken in 1912, when the GOP was mortally divided and Lake County voted for Progressive Party nominee and former President Theodore Roosevelt over conservative incumbent William Howard Taft.

In 1964 the Republican Party nominated Barry Goldwater, whose hostility to the Yankee establishment and strongly conservative platform were sufficient to leave many traditional Republicans to stay home or even to vote for Lyndon Johnson, who narrowly became the first Democrat to win an absolute majority in the county since James K. Polk in 1844, and the first to win it at all since Pierce in 1852. Between 1968 and 1988, however, Lake County became powerfully Republican once more, with no Democrat cracking forty percent of the vote.

However, as in the other collar counties, the Republican edge narrowed considerably in the 1990s, and Bill Clinton actually won it with a 166-vote plurality in 1996–the only time that Clinton won any of the collar counties besides Will County during his two campaigns for president. After narrowly voting for George W. Bush twice, in 2008 it swung over dramatically to support Democrat and then-Illinois Senator Barack Obama, who carried it by almost 20 points. Obama won it but by a slimmer margin in 2012. Hillary Clinton won it handily in 2016, tallying her second-best margin in the state. At 36%, Donald Trump's performance in the county was the worst of any Republican presidential nominee since 1912. In 2020, Joe Biden won 61% of the vote, the highest percentage of the vote for any candidate since 1988 and the highest ever attained by a Democrat.

Lake County has the highest payout for wrongful conviction in the United States.  Juan Rivera was awarded $20 million, the largest wrongful conviction settlement in United States history, including $2 million from John E. Reid & Associates, who were known for the Reid technique of questioning suspects. This technique has been widely criticized for its history of eliciting confessions that were later determined to be false. Rivera was questioned twice at Reid headquarters by an employee of the company during his interrogation, which lasted for several days. Another payout was made to Jerry Hobbs.  Kathleen Zellner settled Jerry Hobbs' civil rights case for $7.75 million. Hobbs was incarcerated for 66 months. This was the largest pre-trial detainee settlement in the United States.

Media
Lake County is covered in the Chicago media market and the county relies on Chicago television stations, radio stations, and newspapers for the source of its news and information.

The county has multiple radio stations, including 102.3 FM XLC and 98.3 FM WRLR.

The Lake County News-Sun, owned by Tribune Publishing, is the county's main print newspaper. It is printed and published in Gurnee.

Lake and McHenry County Scanner, launched in 2012 by Sam Borcia, is the county's biggest digital newspaper which covers Lake County as well as nearby McHenry County, Illinois. The publication's work has been quoted in top news outlets such as Fox News and Yahoo! News.

The county is also covered by the Chicago Sun-Times and The Daily Herald.

Education
The following is a list of school districts with any territory in Lake County, no matter how slight, even if the school districts' administrative headquarters and/or schools are outside of the county:

K-12:
 Barrington Community Unit School District 22
 Lake Zurich Community Unit School District 95
 North Chicago School District 187
 Round Lake Community Unit School District 116
 Wauconda Community Unit School District 118
 Waukegan Community Unit School District 60

Secondary:
 Antioch Community High School District 117
 Community High School District 155
 Grant Community High School District 124
 Grayslake Community High School District 127
 Lake Forest Community High School District 115
 Libertyville Community High School District 128
 Mundelein Consolidated High School District 120
 Richmond-Burton Community High School District 157
 Adlai E. Stevenson High School District 125
 Township High School District 113
 Warren Township High School District 121
 Zion-Benton Township High School District 126

Elementary:
 Antioch Community Consolidated School District 34
 Aptakisic-Tripp Community Consolidated School District
 Bannockburn School District 106
 Beach Park Community Consolidated School District 3
 Big Hollow School District 38
 Cary Community Consolidated School District 26
 Deerfield School District 109
 Diamond Lake School District 76
 Emmons School District 33
 Fox Lake Grade School District 114
 Fremont School District 79
 Gavin School District 37
 Grass Lake School District 36
 Grayslake Consolidated Community School District 46
 Gurnee School District 56
 Hawthorn Community Consolidated School District 73
 Kildeer Countryside Community Consolidated School District 96
 Lake Bluff Elementary School District 65
 Lake Forest School District 67
 Lake Villa Community Consolidated School District 41
 Libertyville School District 70
 Lincolnshire-Prairieview School District 103
 McHenry Community Consolidated School District 15
 Millburn Community Consolidated School District 24
 Mundelein Elementary School District 75
 North Shore School District 112
 Nippersink School District 2
 Oak Grove School District 68
 Rondout School District 72
 Winthrop Harbor School District 1
 Woodland Community Consolidated School District 50
 Zion Elementary School District 6

Notable people
 Jack Benny (February 14, 1894 – December 26, 1974) – entertainer, comedian, actor and musician, Benny was one of America's greatest stars of radio and television, and also appeared in many films; he was raised in Waukegan, Illinois.
 Charles Boyce (September 21, 1949) – cartoonist, creator of syndicated comic panel Compu-toon and the telecommunication public affairs image The KeyPad Kid. 
 Ray Bradbury (August 22, 1920 – June 5, 2012) – fantasy, horror, science fiction, and mystery writer. Best known for his dystopian novel Fahrenheit 451 and The Martian Chronicles, Bradbury is widely considered one of the greatest and most popular American writers of speculative fiction of the twentieth century. Bradbury was born in Waukegan.
 Marlon Brando (April 3, 1924 – July 1, 2004) actor; as a young sex symbol, he is best known for his roles in A Streetcar Named Desire, On the Waterfront and Guys and Dolls. Brando and his family moved to Libertyville, Illinois where he lived from 1937 until 1942.
 Gary Coleman (February 8, 1968 – May 28, 2010) – actor, known for his role as Arnold Jackson in the American sitcom Diff'rent Strokes (1978–1986). Coleman was born in Zion, Illinois.
 Ron Goldman (July 2, 1968 – June 12, 1994), who was killed along with Nicole Brown Simpson grew up in Buffalo Grove.
 Michael Jordan (born February 17, 1963) – retired professional basketball player and active businessman, widely considered one of the greatest players of all time; as of 2015, Jordan had a residence in Highland Park, Illinois.
 Vince Vaughn (born March 28, 1970) – actor, known for his roles in Swingers and Wedding Crashers; grew up in Buffalo Grove, Illinois, then moved to Lake Forest, Illinois, where he graduated from Lake Forest High School in 1988.
 Pete Wilson (born August 23, 1933), Mayor of San Diego (1971-1983); United States Senator from California (1983-1991); and Governor of California (1991-1999), born in Lake Forest.
 Thomas E. Wilson (1868-1958), businessman and founder of 'Wilson Sporting Goods', resident and buried in Lake County.

See also

 IL-53 extension issue
 List of school districts in Lake County, Illinois
 National Register of Historic Places listings in Lake County, Illinois

References

Citations

General sources

External links

 
 Lake County Convention & Visitors Bureau
 Lake County Forest Preserve District

 
Illinois counties
1839 establishments in Illinois
Chicago metropolitan area
Populated places established in 1839